The 2021–21 season of Ghanaian club Dreams F.C . The season covered the period from 20 November 2020 to 8 August 2021

Season overview 
Dreams F.C ended the 2020-21 season without a trophy after placing seventh in the domestic league and was knock out by Asante Kotoko in the FA Cup

Technical team 
The technical team

Squad

Competitions

Premier League

League table

References 

2020–21 Ghana Premier League by team
Association football clubs established in 2009
Dreams F.C. (Ghana)